The fourth and final season of the Yu Yu Hakusho anime series, known as the Saga of the Three Kings, was directed Noriyuki Abe and produced by Fuji Television, Yomiko Advertising and Studio Pierrot. The episodes were released in North America by Funimation. It adapts Yoshihiro Togashi's Yu Yu Hakusho manga series by Yoshihiro Togashi from the seventeenth through nineteenth volumes over eighteen episodes. The episodes cover Yusuke Urameshi's journey to Makai to meet his demon ancestor, and his attempts to resolve the unstable political situation in Makai.

The season initially ran from August 20 to December 17, 1994, on Fuji Television in Japan. The English episodes were shown from December 2005 to April 2006 on Cartoon Network's Toonami programming block.

Three pieces of theme music are used for the episodes; one opening theme and two closing themes.

Six DVD compilations, each containing three episodes of the saga, have been released by Funimation. The first compilation was released on November 23, 2004, and the sixth compilation was released on July 19, 2005. A DVD collection box, containing all six compilations of the saga, was released by Funimation on March 7, 2006. A Blu-ray compilation was released by Funimation on November 29, 2011.

Episode list

References
General

Specific

External links
Studio Pierrot's YuYu Hakusho website 
FUNimation's YuYu Hakusho website

1994 Japanese television seasons
Season 4